Alan Stewart Pritchard (born 24 August 1943) is an English footballer who played as an inside forward in the Football League for Chester City.

References

Chester City F.C. players
Ellesmere Port Town F.C. players
Association football inside forwards
English Football League players
Living people
1943 births
People from Chester
English footballers